Columbus City may refer to:

 Columbus City, Marshall County, Alabama
 Columbus City, Georgia
 Columbus City, Iowa

See also
 Columbus City Hall (disambiguation)
 Columbus (disambiguation)